The École nationale des sciences appliquées de Tanger(ENSAT) located in Tangier the capital of the northern region of Morocco, is a Moroccan engineering school created through a partnership between the University Abdelmalek Essaâdi and INSA de Lyon.

It is a public establishment, training state engineers with general specializations in : telecommunication systems & networks, Computer Engineering, Electronic Systems Engineering and Control, and Industrial Engineering & logistics. It is known to be the first of the ENSAs

References

External links

Ensa Tanger

Education in Morocco